The 2020–21 Hsinchu JKO Lioneers season was the first season of the franchise in the P. LEAGUE+ (PLG), its 1st in the Hsinchu County and playing home games at Hsinchu County Stadium. The Lioneers are coached by Lin Kuan-Lun in his first year as head coach

Preseason 
On September 9, 2020, former Taiwanese professional basketball player Blackie Chen announcing the establishment of P. LEAGUE+ (PLG). The first game of PLG was started on December 19, 2020.

Draft 
The P. LEAGUE+ (PLG) did not hold a draft in its first season.

Standings

Roster

Game log

Preseason

Regular season

Regular season note 
 Due to the COVID-19 pandemic, the Taoyuan City Government and Taoyuan Pilots declared that the games in Taoyuan Arena would be played behind closed doors from January 16, 2021 to February 7, 2021.

Player Statistics 
<noinclude>

Regular season

 Reference：

Transactions

Free Agency

Additions

Subtractions

Awards

End-of-Season Awards

Players of the Month

Players of the Week

Note

References 

Hsinchu JKO Lioneers seasons
H